Tha Duea is a tambon (subdistrict) of Doi Tao District, in Chiang Mai Province, Thailand. In 2005 it had a population of 3242. The tambon contains six villages.

References

Tambon of Chiang Mai province
Populated places in Chiang Mai province